Goodnow is an unincorporated community located in the town of Cassian, Oneida County, Wisconsin, United States.

References

Unincorporated communities in Oneida County, Wisconsin
Unincorporated communities in Wisconsin